Robert C. "Bob" Jaugstetter (born June 15, 1948 in Savannah, Georgia) is an American former competitive coxswain on U.S. National Crews and U.S. Olympic Crews.

Education
Jaugstetter is a 1970 graduate of Saint Joseph's University.

Olympics
Jaugstetter qualified for the 1980 U.S. Olympic team but was not able to compete due to the U.S. Olympic Committee's boycott of the 1980 Summer Olympics in Moscow, Russia. He was one of 461 athletes to receive a Congressional Gold Medal many years later. He was a member of the American men's eights team that won silver medal at the 1984 Summer Olympics in Los Angeles, California.

Coaching career
 St Joseph Prep School
 Wichita State University
 Northeastern University
 Tulane University

References

1948 births
Living people
Rowers at the 1984 Summer Olympics
Olympic silver medalists for the United States in rowing
American male rowers
Medalists at the 1984 Summer Olympics
Congressional Gold Medal recipients
Pan American Games medalists in rowing
Pan American Games gold medalists for the United States
Pan American Games bronze medalists for the United States
Rowers at the 1975 Pan American Games